Cirrhimuraena oliveri is an eel in the family Ophichthidae (worm/snake eels). It was described by Alvin Seale in 1910. It is a tropical, marine eel which is known from the Philippines, in the western central Pacific Ocean.

References

Ophichthidae
Fish described in 1910